A number of German vessels have been named Augsburg for the city of Augsburg:

German Navy ship names